Grama Vokkaliga is a sub group of Halakki Vokkaliga community of Karnataka residing in Uttara Kannada district. The people from this community are situated in the coastal area, namely Honnavar and Kumta, and highlands namely Siddapur and Sirsi of Uttara Kannada district.  In Honnavar, Siddapur and Sirsi they are being called by the surname Gowda and in Kumta by Patagar/ Patgar.

Grama vokkaligas are basically farmers/ agriculturists. Vokkaliga is a Kannada word of considerable antiquity and Grama refers to this group of people residing in grama/villages.

References 

1. ಗ್ರಾಮೊಕ್ಕಲ ಮಹಾಭಾರತ, ಸಂಪಾದಕ: ಡಾ. ಎನ್.ಆರ್.ನಾಯಕ, ಪ್ರಸಾರಾಂಗ, ಕರ್ನಾಟಕ ವಿಶ್ವ ವಿದ್ಯಾಲಯ, ಧಾರವಾಡ (೧೯೯೨)

2. ಗ್ರಾಮೊಕ್ಕಲು- ಒಂದು ಸಾಂಸ್ಕ್ರತಿಕ ಅಧ್ಯಯನ, ಡಾ. ಎನ್.ಆರ್.ನಾಯಕ, ಜಾನಪದ ಪ್ರಕಾಶನ, ಹೊನ್ನಾವರ (೨೦೦೪)

Social groups of Karnataka